The People's Empowerment Party (PEP) is a left-wing political party in Barbados. The party was established on 14 January 2006 as the electoral wing of the Clement Payne Movement. Led by David Comissiong, it received only 198 votes in the 2008 elections and failed to win a seat.

References

Communist parties in Barbados
Foro de São Paulo
Political parties established in 2006
Political parties in Barbados
Republican parties
Republicanism in Barbados